Båring is a small town in Middelfart municipality on Funen, Denmark with a population of 933 (1 January 2022). Prior to the Kommunalreformen ("The Municipality Reform" of 2007) it was part of Nørre Aaby municipality, and is situated close to the sea on the north-west coast of Funen.

References

Cities and towns in the Region of Southern Denmark
Populated places in Funen
Middelfart Municipality